Philippe Ciais is a researcher of the Laboratoire des Sciences du Climat et de l'Environnement (LSCE), the climate change research unit of the Institut Pierre Simon Laplace (IPSL). He is a physicist working on the global carbon cycle of planet Earth, climate change, ecology and geosciences.

Professional career 

Philippe Ciais studied physics at École normale supérieure and received a PhD in 1991 entitled “Holocene climate record of Antarctic ice cores”.

In 1992 he was a post-doctoral fellow at National Oceanic and Atmospheric Administration (NOAA) in Boulder, Colorado, U.S. and investigated how carbon and oxygen isotopes in atmospheric CO2 can be used to constrain terrestrial carbon fluxes. He also designed the first three-dimensional simulation model of the heavy oxygen isotope in CO2, an isotopic tracer of the water cycle coupled with carbon dioxide uptake by plant photosynthesis.

After 1994, Philippe Ciais returned to France at LSCE and carried out research into the inverse modeling of CO2 and CH4 fluxes at the surface of the Earth, based on transport models and a global network of surface in-situ stations. Under his leadership, this activity has been developed at LSCE into a research team. In parallel, Philippe Ciais led the establishment of the French greenhouse gas atmospheric monitoring network, going from two stations in 1992 to 25 stations today, and became a key component of the Integrated Carbon Observation System (ICOS) large-scale European research infrastructure.

Philippe Ciais continued research during the last twenty years, mainly on the relationships between ecosystem CO2 fluxes and climate, combining terrestrial biosphere models with satellite and eddy-covariance observations. He took part in the set up and interpretation of one of the first coupled carbon-climate simulation with the IPSL climate model, and pioneered the incorporation of cultivated ecosystems into a terrestrial biosphere model.

Philippe Ciais has been scientific coordinator or principal investigator of French, European Union and International projects and became co-chair of the Global Carbon Project in 2009. He had the opportunity to contribute to several synthesis of recent trends in the carbon cycle, characterized by the recent fast growth of emissions and by a slowing trend of natural sinks, a finding that had a large impact in the media.

He acted as co-chair of the Global Carbon Observation Strategy of the Group on Earth Observation (GEO) task force on integrated carbon observations.

He has worked for the IPCC in the Fourth IPCC Assessment Report, which was awarded the 2007 Nobel Peace Prizee, and coordinated the Chapter 6 "Carbon and other biogeochemical cycles" in the IPCC Fifth Assessment Report.

He is one of the principal investigators of the ERC-Synergy 2014-2019 grant IMBALANCE-P project, dealing with phosphorus and nitrogen imbalance of organisms, ecosystems and the earth system.

A collaboration with Beijing University has been maintained with the SINO-FRENCH SOFIE Research Institute for Earth System Science led by Shilong Piao and Philippe Ciais.

Publications 

Philippe Ciais is a highly cited researcher in two fields: Geosciences and Environment/Ecology and in all the fields of the ISI science indicators (Thomson Reuters). He has ranked as the most productive scientific author in the field of climate change, and among the authors who contributed to 5 of the 100 most influential papers in this field in a recent CarbonBrief analysis (2015) and was ranked among the list of Highly Cited Researchers in Clarivate Analytics.

He has published more than 650 scientific papers and contributed to the dissemination of science activities at national and international level including:

Awards and honors 

He has received several awards-prizes both national and international.

 In 2013, the Award Stars of Europe from the French Ministry of Research and Higher Education Etoiles de l’Europe.
 In 2016, the European Copernicus Medal from the Copernicus Gesellschaft that recognizes ingenious, innovative work in the geosciences or in the planetary and space sciences. 
 In 2017, the Silver Medal of the Centre National de la Recherche Scientifique (CNRS) for his research on the quantification and understanding of greenhouse gas fluxes.
In 2019 elected member of the French Academy of sciences.

References

External links
Le Laboratoire des Sciences du Climat et de l'Environnement (LSCE)
ERC Synergy Grant: IMBALANCE-P
 
"Who is Who" in the Global Carbon Project

French climatologists
French physicists
Intergovernmental Panel on Climate Change lead authors
École Normale Supérieure alumni
Living people
Year of birth missing (living people)
Place of birth missing (living people)
Members of the French Academy of Sciences
Foreign members of the Chinese Academy of Sciences